The Cathedral of St Stephen is the heritage-listed cathedral church of the Roman Catholic Archdiocese of Brisbane and seat of its archbishop in Brisbane, Queensland, Australia. St Stephen's was only meant to serve as a temporary seat for the archbishop, and plans for a replacement were made with the Holy Name Cathedral, however the cathedral was never built.

History 
The cathedral is located on a site bounded by Elizabeth, Charlotte, Creek, and Edward Streets, in the Australian city of Brisbane, Queensland. James Quinn, the first bishop of Brisbane, arrived in 1861 from Ireland, and soon planned to build a large cathedral to accommodate a growing congregation. On 26 December 1863, the Feast of St Stephen, Quinn laid the foundation stone for a grand cathedral designed by Benjamin Backhouse, but this did not at first proceed beyond the foundations. R George Suter was then commissioned to design a smaller, simpler church partly on the foundations, and the current nave was built 1870–74, with the front gables and spires completed 1884. No further was undertaken until James Duhig took up the archbishopric in 1917. With plans to build new larger Holy Name Cathedral in Fortitude Valley, he engaged architects Hennessy, Hennessy & Co to complete St Stephen's with a crossing, transepts and sanctuary in a simpler design than intended, which was built in 1920–22.

Description
St Stephen's is a gothic revival cathedral with a cruciform shape in plan. While this is a plain cathedral by comparison it still has a selection of striking features such as the spire topped sandstone towers, imported stained glass windows from Munich, the organ, the altar and the newer Blessed Sacrament Chapel at the rear of the building. Of particular note is the stained glass window by Harry Clarke, known as the "Mayne" window, which is located above the sanctuary on the east wall. The cathedral is made predominantly of Brisbane tuff and freestone. The Blessed Sacrament Chapel is made from reinforced concrete and the restored spires from glass reinforced concrete.

Inside the cathedral the stained glass windows are vividly illuminated by the sun and cast coloured patterns on the floor and walls. Some of them are small with intimate pictures of Christ and his followers, while the great window over the main door stands tall and proud as it depicts Christ's ascension, then casts its majesty down the length of the great space. The lightweight plaster ceilings arc gracefully overhead. There is a noted contrast between the interior and exterior qualities of space. The interior has a cool and refreshing quality.

Restoration and refurbishment
By the 1980s the cathedral had fallen into a state of disrepair. The interior layout of the building was also unsuitable for the new Catholic liturgy. When it became clear that the planned Holy Name Cathedral, the construction of which had never proceeded beyond the completion of its crypt in 1934, would not proceed, it was decided that St Stephen's and its grounds would undergo major refurbishment which would involve preserving the fabric of the building but replacing all furnishings and interior fittings. As part of the refurbishment the cathedral grounds were enlarged and a carpark was built under the extended east end of the cathedral. The last stage of the cathedral restoration was completed in 2000 when the Jubilee Pipe Organ was installed above the sanctuary.

Cathedral grounds
In addition to the cathedral, the site contains numerous buildings that support the cathedral and the Archdiocese of Brisbane.

St Stephen's Chapel (also known as Old St Stephen's Church) stands immediately to the south-west of the cathedral. The chapel was designed by English architect Augustus Pugin and built between 1847 and 1850. The first Mass was celebrated in the completed building on 12 May 1850. In June 1859 it became the cathedral for the first Bishop of Brisbane. It is the oldest Catholic church in Queensland.

Old St Stephen's School is a three level building facing Charlotte Street. This building was the location of St Stephen's School until the 1960s. The building now contains offices for the Archdiocese of Brisbane.

The Francis Rush Centre was completed in July 2005. The two storey building is the location for the cathedral's administration centre, the offices of the bishops, the choir room and several function and meeting rooms. A new under cover outdoor liturgical space was constructed as part of this development and facilitates special liturgies such as the Easter Vigil and Palm Sunday.

Music

The cathedral currently has three choirs, which perform in the liturgical-north transept where they are amply and clearly able to be heard from the nave both in liturgical works and in leading and complementing the cathedral's customary vigorous congregational hymn-singing. The current cathedral choir was formed in 1970 and is an all-male choir in the English choral tradition. The choir sings at the 10:00 am mass every Sunday except during school holiday periods in June and July, September and January. In addition to this weekly commitment the choir also sings at most major events at the cathedral including Easter, Christmas and ordinations.

The choir has enjoyed high standards throughout its 30-year history during which it has made numerous recordings. The most recent of these was of traditional Christmas carols.

In addition to the choir the cathedral also has a chamber ensemble called The Schola of the Cathedral of St Stephen. The group was formed as part of the restructuring of the cathedral's music department in 2000 and is fully professional. The Schola sings at the 12.00 pm Mass every Sunday and augments the cathedral choir at major events. Both the cathedral choir and The Schola are conducted by Christopher Trikilis, the cathedral's director of music.

The cathedral also has a community choir of approximately 20 voices called St Stephen's Chorale. The chorale sings at the noon Mass once a month. The chorale is conducted by the cathedral sub-organist, Gregory Mayer.

References

External links

 Cathedral website

Roman Catholic cathedrals in Queensland
Roman Catholic churches in Brisbane
History of Brisbane
Roman Catholic churches completed in 1922
Queensland Heritage Register
Gothic Revival church buildings in Australia
Elizabeth Street, Brisbane
Charlotte Street, Brisbane
Benjamin Backhouse church buildings
19th-century Roman Catholic church buildings in Australia
20th-century Roman Catholic church buildings in Australia
Roman Catholic Archdiocese of Brisbane